The Roman Catholic Diocese of Shanghai is an ecclesiastical territory or diocese of the Roman Catholic Church in the Municipality of Shanghai, China. It was erected on December 13, 1933 as the Apostolic Vicariate of Shanghai by Pope Pius XI, and was later elevated to the rank of a diocese on April 11, 1946 by Pope Pius XII. The diocese is a suffragan of the Archdiocese of Nanking.

Churches
The diocese's motherchurch and thus seat of its bishop is St. Ignatius Cathedral; it also houses a minor basilica in Sheshan.

Bishops

In 1950, Pope Pius XII appointed the Bishop of Suzhou, Ignatius Kung Pin-Mei, bishop of Shanghai. In 1955, he was arrested and given a life sentence in 1960. In the same year, the Chinese Patriotic Catholic Association (CPCA) appointed Aloysius Zhang Jiashu, S.J. as Bishop of Shanghai to replace Kung, thereby being the first illicitly consecrated bishop of this diocese. In 1985, his Jesuit confrere, Aloysius Jin Luxian, S.J., was illicitly ordained as the Auxiliary Bishop of Shanghai, and became the Bishop of Shanghai upon the death of Zhang in 1988. In the meantime, Bishop Kung was released from prison and placed under house arrest in 1985 and then sent to the United States in 1988, where he would die in 2000. Bishop Kung was made a cardinal in pectore in 1979 and officially informed of his cardinalate in 1991.

Upon the death of Cardinal Kung, the Holy See recognized 82-year-old Joseph Fan Zhongliang, S.J. of the underground Church as the legitimate successor in 2000. Shortly thereafter, Bishop Jin reconciled with the Holy See and was thus recognized as the coadjutor bishop of Shanghai. In the 2000s, Bishop Jin increasingly worked with Bishop Fan in administering the diocese, despite the fact that the CPCA did not recognize the latter's authority. In 2005, Bishop Jin revealed that Fan had been suffering from Alzheimers and both the Holy See and the CPCA agreed to the consecration of Giuseppe Xing Wenzhi as the Auxiliary Bishop of Shanghai in hopes that this mutually agreed upon bishop would succeed both Fan and Jin to heal the rift between the Holy See and the CPCA. However, in 2010 Auxiliary Bishop Xing asked for personal reasons not to be the successor in this diocese.

In 2012, both the Holy See and the CPCA agreed upon the consecration of 44-year-old Thaddeus Ma Daqin. There was a disagreement of his status, with the Holy See appointing him as the auxiliary bishop (given that Jin was technically still the coadjutor) while the CPCA appointed him as the coadjutor bishop. Despite this technical disagreement, it appeared that both had the intention of Ma becoming the next Bishop of Shanghai. In a surprising move, Ma announced during his ordination Mass that he would be resigning from his posts within the CPCA effective immediately. The next day, government officials placed him under house arrest at the Sheshan Seminary and the CPCA stripped him of his title as coadjutor bishop in December 2012. Upon the death of Jin Luxian in April 2013, the CPCA officially recognized a sede vacante in Shanghai while the Holy See maintains that Auxiliary Bishop Ma should be administering the diocese. Soon afterwards, government officials transferred Ma to Beijing.

List of ordinaries of Shanghai
See source:
Bishop Auguste Haouissée, SJ (1933–1948)
Cardinal Ignatius Kung Pin-Mei (1950–2000)
Bishop Aloysius Zhang Jiashu, SJ (1960–1988) (non-canonical)
Bishop Aloysius Jin Luxian, SJ (1988–2013) (non-canonical until 2005, recognised as co-adjutor bishop in 2005 by Pope Benedict XVI)
Bishop Joseph Fan Zhongliang, SJ (2000–2014)
Bishop Thaddeus Ma Daqin (2014–present)

See also 

 Xu Guangqi
 St. Ignatius Cathedral of Shanghai
 Christianity in China
 Roman Catholicism in China
 List of Roman Catholic dioceses in China
 List of Roman Catholic dioceses (structured_view)-Episcopal Conference of China

References

External links

Catholic-Hierarchy
GCatholic
UCAN Diocese Profile
"Keeping Faith," July/August 2007, The Atlantic
A Rebuttal To "Keeping Faith" , The Cardinal Kung Foundation

Christian organizations established in 1933
Christianity in Shanghai
Geography of Shanghai
Organizations based in Shanghai
Shanghai
Roman Catholic dioceses and prelatures established in the 20th century
1933 establishments in China